Puya laxa is a species in the genus Puya. This species is endemic to Bolivia.

Cultivars
 xPuckia 'Sparkle'
 xPucohnia 'George Anderson'

References

BSI Cultivar Registry Retrieved 11 October 2009

laxa
Flora of Bolivia